The Gorman Buddies were a West Texas League baseball team based in Gorman, Texas, United States that played for part of the 1920 season. Before the season ended, they moved to Sweetwater, Texas to become the Sweetwater Swatters. They are the only professional team to come out of Gorman, Texas.

Major league baseball player Guy Sturdy played for them.

References

Baseball teams established in 1920
Defunct minor league baseball teams
Eastland County, Texas
Defunct baseball teams in Texas
Baseball teams disestablished in 1920
1920 establishments in Texas
1920 disestablishments in Texas